Tamate ka kut (tamate is the plural of tomato) is another classic Hyderabadi dish of Hyderabadi origin. It is popular among Hyderabadi Muslims and part of a vast and rich Hyderabadi cuisine.

References

External links
 http://zaiqa.net/?p=262

Hyderabadi cuisine
Telangana cuisine
Indian vegetable dishes